Dylan Joseph DeLucia (born August 1, 2000) is an American baseball pitcher in the Cleveland Guardians organization.

Career
DeLucia graduated from New Smyrna Beach High School in New Smyrna Beach, Florida. He began his college baseball career at Northwest Florida State College, before he transferred to the University of Mississippi to play for the Ole Miss Rebels after two seasons. He was named the College World Series Most Outstanding Player for the 2022 College World Series. After the season, Baseball America named DeLucia a third team All-American.

Eligible to be selected in the 2022 Major League Baseball draft, the Cleveland Guardians selected DeLucia in the sixth round, with the 181st overall pick.

References

External links

Living people
2000 births
People from Port Orange, Florida
Baseball players from Florida
Baseball pitchers
Northwest Florida State Raiders baseball players
Ole Miss Rebels baseball players